Monte Gradiccioli is a mountain of the Lugano Prealps, located between Indemini and Sigirino in the canton of Ticino. It lies south of Monte Tamaro, on the range between Lake Maggiore and Lake Lugano.

References

External links
 Monte Gradiccioli on Hikr

Mountains of the Alps
Mountains of Ticino
Mountains of Switzerland